Montenero di Bisaccia is a small hill top town and comune (municipality). It is in the Province of Campobasso, which is in the region of Molise, in Italy. The nearest large town and airport is Pescara.  
Montenero di Bisaccia borders the following municipalities: Cupello, Guglionesi, Lentella, Mafalda, Montecilfone, Palata, Petacciato, San Felice del Molise, San Salvo, Tavenna.

It is the birthplace of former judge and Italian minister Antonio di Pietro and of screenwriter Dardano Sacchetti.

See also
 Molise Croats

References

External links

 http://www.montenerolife.it/portale

Cities and towns in Molise